Grove Mount is a historic plantation house located near Warsaw in Richmond County, Virginia, United States. The main house was built about 1780–1800 by Robert Mitchell with the profits of forced labor; by 1808, he had enslaved 76 people. It is a large, two-story, five-bay Late Georgian-style frame dwelling. It has a hipped roof and interior end chimneys. A kitchen wing was added in 1952 and an orangery added in 1989. Also on the property are the contributing late-18th century dairy, a log corn crib, and a late-19th or early-20th century frame outbuilding. There is also the archeological site of the former kitchen and possibly other outbuildings adjacent to the old kitchen.

It was added to the National Register of Historic Places in 1977.

References

Plantation houses in Virginia
Houses on the National Register of Historic Places in Virginia
Houses completed in 1800
Georgian architecture in Virginia
Houses in Richmond County, Virginia
National Register of Historic Places in Richmond County, Virginia
1800 establishments in Virginia